Cachoeiras de Macacu (means "Macacu Waterfalls" in Portuguese) is a municipality located in the Brazilian state of Rio de Janeiro. Its population was 59,303 (2020) and its area is 956 km². Next to neighboring Rio Bonito municipality, it can be considered an exurb of Greater Rio de Janeiro metropolis.

Conservation

The municipality contains part of the Central Rio de Janeiro Atlantic Forest Mosaic, created in 2006.
It held 76% of the  Paraíso Ecological Station, created in 1987 and now integrated into the Três Picos State Park.
It contains 49% of the  Três Picos State Park, created in 2002.
It contains part of the  Bacia do Rio Macacu Environmental Protection Area, created in 2002.

References

Municipalities in Rio de Janeiro (state)